Bosco Chiesanuova is a comune (municipality) in the Province of Verona in the Italian region Veneto, located about  west of Venice and about  north of Verona. It is part of the Thirteen Communities, a group of villages which historically speak the Cimbrian language.

Bosco Chiesanuova borders the following municipalities: Ala, Cerro Veronese, Erbezzo, Grezzana, Roverè Veronese, and Selva di Progno.

Massimo Moratti was born here.

References

External links
 Official website

Cities and towns in Veneto
Bosco Chiesanuova